Mahomed Solomon Navsa (born 24 May 1957) is a judge of the Supreme Court of Appeal of South Africa and its Acting Deputy President in 2015.

Early life
Navsa was born in 1957 in Edenvale, Gauteng. He studied at the University of the Western Cape, where he obtained a BA degree in 1978 and an LLB degree in 1980 and he also was heavily involved in setting up and running the community law clinic.

Career
Navsa was admitted to the Bar in 1981 and subsequently took up employment at the Legal Resources Centre, for fourteen year sand was director of the Johannesburg office from 1990 to 1994. In September 1994  he was granted senior counsel and shortly thereafter was appointed as an Acting Judge of the Supreme Court. Navsa se was appointed to the Bench in the Transvaal Division of the Supreme Court on 1 July 1995.

He was appointed to the bench of the Supreme Court of Appeal with effect from 9 December 2000 and acted as Constitutional Court judge during 2008. During 2015, Navsa acted as the deputy President of the Supreme Court of Appeal.

References

1957 births
Living people
People from Edenvale, Gauteng
South African judges
South African Senior Counsel